Erwin Hymer (27 July 1930 – 12 April 2013) was a German businessman, and the founder of the motorhome manufacturer Hymer.
In 2000 he received Order of Merit of the Federal Republic of Germany.

References

1930 births
2013 deaths
People from Bad Waldsee
People from the Free People's State of Württemberg
German company founders
20th-century German businesspeople
21st-century German businesspeople
Recipients of the Cross of the Order of Merit of the Federal Republic of Germany